Laurentia may refer to:

Geography
 Laurentia, the continental craton at the heart of North America
 Laurentia, a former continent
 North America, the continent
 Laurentian Shield, the shield at the heart of the craton
 Laurentian Mountains 
 Saint Lawrence River basin
 Laurentia (bioregion)
 Laurentia, a proposed deep-water container terminal at the Port of Quebec
Laurentie (concept), a poetic name given to Quebec, and a name for the idea of an independent Quebec, from the 1930s to the 1950s

Media
Laurentie (magazine), a magazine of the Alliance laurentienne, a Quebec independence organization in the 1950s
Laurentia (film), also known as Laurentie, a film directed by Mathieu Denis

People
 surname "Laurentia", see Laurentius
 Saint Laurentia, see Palatias and Laurentia
Pierre-Sébastien Laurentie

Biology
 Laurentia (moth), a moth genus of the family Pyralidae
 Doxocopa laurentia, a butterfly of the family Nymphalidae
 Amaxia laurentia, a moth of the subfamily Arctiinae
 Palmerella or Laurentia, a genus of flower in the family Campanulaceae
 Isotoma axillaris, a blue-flowered herbaceous perennial sometimes called 'laurentia'

Other
 162 Laurentia, asteroid
 USS Laurentia (AF-44), US Navy World War II stores ship

See also
 Laurentian (disambiguation)